HBP may refer to:

 Azurocidin 1, or heparin-binding protein
 Hairpin-binding protein
 Harry Potter and the Half-Blood Prince
 Harvard Business Publishing
 High blood pressure or hypertension
 Hit by pitch in baseball
 Hornbeam Park railway station, in England
 Human Brain Project